Alfredo Pacheco Osoria (born 12 January 1959) is a Dominican Republic politician from the Modern Revolutionary Party who has been President of the Chamber of Deputies since 16 August 2020.

References 

Living people
1959 births
Modern Revolutionary Party politicians
Presidents of the Chamber of Deputies of the Dominican Republic
20th-century Dominican Republic lawyers
21st-century Dominican Republic politicians